Montreal-South (French: Montréal-Sud) was a suburb of Montreal located on the south shore of the St. Lawrence River founded in 1906. Montréal-Sud was created from land of the Saint-Antoine-de-Longueuil parish. Originally a village in its first five years, Montréal-Sud gained the status of city in 1911.

Early in its existence, its population was split between French-speaking Roman Catholics and English-speaking Protestants. This changed by the middle of the century, as the Francophones became the overwhelming majority.

The approximate territorial limits of the city were La Fayette Boulevard in the west, Bertrand Street in the south, Joliette Street in the east and St. Lawrence River in the north.

Like neighbouring Longueuil, Montréal-Sud was an enclave of the parish Saint-Antoine-de-Longueuil (later known as Ville Jacques-Cartier).

Merger with Longueuil and aftermath

On January 28, 1961, the city of Montréal-Sud merged with the city of Longueuil, keeping the latter's name.
After Montréal-Sud was dissolved, its former territory underwent a major urban renewal that began in the mid-1960s.

Place Charles-Le Moyne
Place Charles-Le Moyne, Longueuil's primary transit hub and business center, is in the former territory of Montréal-Sud.

It is the location of the Longueuil bus terminus and Longueuil-Université-de-Sherbrooke metro station (the terminus of the Metro's Yellow line). Most of Longueuil's high-rise residential and office buildings are located in this area, including 99 Place Charles-Le Moyne, which is 30 stories tall, and is the tallest building in Greater Montreal off the Island of Montreal.

There is also a hotel on de Sérigny street. Since 1972, the hotel has carried the banners Holiday Inn, Ramada, Radisson and now Sandman.

Université de Sherbrooke constructed a campus in the area, including a 17-story and a 12-story tower.

Place Charles-Le Moyne is surrounded by major highways, Autoroute 20/Route 132 near the river in the north, the entrance ramp of Jacques-Cartier Bridge to the west, and Taschereau Boulevard to the south and east.

The Ville de Longueuil announced in 2017 that it is seeking $3 billion to invest in the area. The plan, called "Longueuil 2035," would re-brand the area around Place Charles-Le Moyne as "Downtown Longueuil" and position it as an accessible alternative to downtown Montreal. The plan includes multiple new residential and office buildings, creating direct access to the nearby Saint Lawrence River for recreational use, and improved cycling and pedestrian access.

Place Longueuil
Also located within the former municipal boundaries of Montréal-Sud is Place Longueuil, a shopping centre located 500 metres (500 yards) north-east of Place Charles-Le Moyne.

Place Longueuil was the first shopping mall in Longueuil and is now the largest mall within city limits. Place Longueuil lies between Place Charles-Le Moyne and rue St-Charles, the commercial street in Old Longueuil.

Mayors

Population
Montréal-Sud merged with Longueuil on January 28, 1961.

Location (1960)

References

1906 establishments in Quebec
1961 disestablishments in Quebec
Former municipalities in Quebec
Longueuil